Nigeria observes West Africa Time (WAT), which is one hour ahead of Coordinated Universal Time (UTC+01:00), year-round as standard time. Nigeria has never observed daylight saving time. It shares WAT with fourteen other countries in Africa. Nigeria's local mean time was UTC+00:13:35.

Prior to 1 January 1914, Nigeria was not unified; the Southern Nigeria Protectorate and the Northern Nigeria Protectorate were separate entities. Lagos, the capital of the Southern Nigeria Protectorate, first adopted the standard time of Greenwich Mean Time (UTC±00:00) on 1 July 1905, but reverted back to local mean time on 1 July 1908. After the protectorates were amalgamated, UTC+00:30 was adopted nationwide. On 1 September 1919, Nigeria adopted UTC+01:00 as it was seen as a more accurate offset from Greenwich Mean Time.

History 
Nigeria's local mean time was UTC+00:13:35. Greenwich Mean Time (GMT; UTC±00:00) was adopted as the standard time of capital Lagos in the Southern Nigeria Protectorate—a protectorate of the British Empire—on 1 July 1905, however Lagos reverted back to local mean time on 1 July 1908. The Southern and Northern Nigeria Protectorates were amalgamated to form the Colony and Protectorate of Nigeria on 1 January 1914. Accordingly, UTC+00:30 was adopted as the universal standard time of the newly unified Nigeria.

On 28 August 1919, the first reading of the Ordinance to amend the Interpretation Ordinance, 1914 bill to switch Nigeria's time zone to UTC+01:00 took place. The acting legal adviser stated it was proposed that a common method of expressing time throughout the British Empire be adopted so that the "Military, Naval, and Air Services may use the same time," and that the proposal was "that the Globe should be divided into twelve zones East and West of Greenwich, of one hour each, Nigeria falling into the zone with a standard of one hour fast on Greenwich Mean Time." The bill passed on 1 September 1919, with Nigeria accordingly adopting UTC+01:00 as its new standard time.

Geography 
Nigeria is located between both the meridians of UTC+01:00 and UTC+02:00, but chooses to observe the former. Nigeria's standard meridian—and thus the standard meridian of West Africa Time—is located at the 15th meridian east.

IANA time zone database 
In the IANA time zone database, Nigeria is given one zone in the file zone.tab—Africa/Lagos. Lagos is Nigeria's capital city. "NG" refers to the country's ISO 3166-1 alpha-2 country code. Data for Nigeria directly from zone.tab of the IANA time zone database; columns marked with * are the columns from zone.tab itself:

Computers which do not support "Africa/Lagos" may use the older POSIX syntax: TZ="WAT-1".

See also 
Time in Africa
List of time zones by country

References

External links 
Current time in Nigeria at Time.is
Time in Nigeria at Ti-Me.in
Time in Nigeria at TimeAndDate.com

Time in Nigeria